is the 4th single by Zard and released 5 August 1992 under B-Gram Records label. Zard made their first public debut with this song in TV program Music Station three times. The single debuted at #8 rank first week. It charted for 17 weeks and sold over 458,000 copies. The single entered into top 10 ranks for first time after debut single Good-bye My Loneliness.

Track list
All songs are written by Izumi Sakai.

composer: Tetsurō Oda/arrangement: Masao Akashi and Daisuke ikeda
the song was used in TV Asahi program Tonight as ending theme
"Dangerous Tonight"
composer: Seiichirou Kuribayashi/arrangement: Akashi
"Nemurenai Yoru wo Daite" (Original Karaoke)
"Dangerous Tonight" (Original Karaoke)

References

1992 singles
Zard songs
Songs written by Izumi Sakai
Songs written by Tetsurō Oda
Song recordings produced by Daiko Nagato